Kaleem is a given name. Notable people with the name include:

Kaleem Barreto, Scottish rugby union player
Kaleem Haitham (born 1998), English professional footballer
Aamir Kaleem (born 1981), Omani cricketer
Mazhar Kaleem (born 1942), Pakistani novelist known for his Imran Series novels
Muhammad Kaleem (born 1985), Emirati cricketer
Musa Kaleem (1921–1988), American jazz saxophonist and flautist
Pervaiz Kaleem, Pakistani film screenwriter and a director, based in Lahore
Kaleem Ullah Khan, Indian horticulturist and fruit breeder
Kaleem Omar (1937–2009), Pakistani journalist and English language poet
Kaleem Saadat (born 1951), retired air force general in the Pakistan Air Force and Chief of Air Staff
Kaleem Shah (entrepreneur) (born 1962), American entrepreneur, computer engineer and owner of Thoroughbred race horses
Kaleem Shaukat, three-star rank admiral in the Pakistan Navy, Vice-Chief of Naval Staff since 2017
Kaleem Taylor, British singer of Promesses, a song by French producer/DJ Tchami
 Kaleem Mohammed,Phd pharmacist who isolated Laurenditerpenol, fist anticancer HIF-1 inhibitor from marine sources

See also
Khawaja Kaleem Ahmed or Dawn (newspaper), Pakistan's oldest, leading and most widely read English-language newspaper
Major Kaleem Case, the bedrock of many Pakistani governmental and military operations against the Muttahida Qaumi Movement, namely Operation Clean-up